Brunei Continental Cycling Team was a continental cycling team registered in Brunei that participated in UCI Continental Circuits races. The team was managed by Muhamad Firdaus Daud with assistance from directeurs sportifs Arnold de Leeuw, Ali Gulcan, Keith Mcrae, Yong Li Ng and Reduan Yusop.

Team roster

Major wins
2019
 1st  Overall Tour of Kosovo, Charalampos Kastrantas
 Points classification, Charalampos Kastrantas
1st Stages 1, 2 & 3, Charalampos Kastrantas

References

Cycling teams based in Brunei
UCI Continental Teams
Cycling teams established in 2019
2019 establishments in Brunei
Cycling teams disestablished in 2019